Rabbi Ilai  (sometimes referred to as Ilai the Elder; others: Rabbi Ilai I, or Alternative Hebrew spelling: רבי עילאי ) was a third Generation, and 2nd-century Jewish Tanna sage, father of the well-known Tanna sage, Judah ben Ilai, and disciple of Eliezer ben Hurcanus and Gamaliel II.

Rabbi Ilai is cited once in the Mishnah, and six times in the Tosefta.

Quotes 
A man is known in three things: by his purse, by his drinking and by his anger.

References

Mishnah rabbis
2nd-century rabbis